William James Marshall (August 8, 1908 – August 31, 1990), nicknamed "Boisy", was an American Negro league second baseman between 1926 and 1944.

A native of Montgomery, Alabama, Marshall played seven seasons with the Chicago American Giants from 1932 to 1938. He also played for the Philadelphia Stars in 1936, and the Kansas City Monarchs in 1938, and finished his career with a brief stint with the Cincinnati Clowns in 1944. Marshall died in Chicago, Illinois in 1990 at age 82.

References

External links
 and Baseball-Reference Black Baseball stats and Seamheads

1908 births
1990 deaths
Chicago American Giants players
Kansas City Monarchs players
Philadelphia Stars players
Baseball second basemen
Baseball players from Montgomery, Alabama
20th-century African-American sportspeople